Giovanni Anastasi (1765–1860) was born into an Armenian family from Damascus. He established himself as a wealthy merchant and antiquarian. Anastasi served as a Swedish-Norwegian Consul General from 1828 until his death. He sold large collections of antiquities—to the Dutch government in 1828, now in the Dutch National Museum of Antiquities in Leiden, including the Ipuwer Papyrus; another collection—to the British Museum in 1839, and another to the French in 1857.
In 1839, the British Museum acquired from Anastasi's collection ostracon of Sinuhe.

See also 
 Giovanni di Niccolò Pappaffy, his nephew, Greek Ottoman merchant in British Malta

References

Bibliography 

 Vassilis I. Chrysikopoulos: A l’aube de l’égyptologie hellénique et de la constitution des collections égyptiennes: Des nouvelles découvertes sur Giovanni d’Anastasi et Tassos Neroutsos. In: P. Kousoulis, N. Lazaridis (eds.): "Proceedings of the Tenth International Congress of Egyptologists". Peeters, Leuven 2013 [In press]. digital text (with full career).

Syrian art dealers
1765 births
1860 deaths